The 2016 AFC Futsal Championship qualification was a men's futsal competition which decided the participating teams of the 2016 AFC Futsal Championship. A total of 16 teams qualified to play in the final tournament, including Japan, Iran, Uzbekistan (hosts), who qualified directly as the top three finishers of the 2014 AFC Futsal Championship. Since third-placed Uzbekistan qualified automatically as hosts, Kuwait, who finished fourth, would have also qualified as the next best-ranked team, but they were later replaced due to FIFA's suspension of the Kuwait Football Association.

The top five teams of the final tournament qualified for the 2016 FIFA Futsal World Cup in Colombia.

Teams
A total of 26 AFC member national teams entered the qualifying stage, split into zones according to their regional affiliations.
West Asia had seven entrants, where they were drawn into one group of four teams and one group of three teams.
Central Asia had four entrants, where they were all placed in one group.
South Asia had no entrants.
ASEAN had ten entrants, with the 2015 AFF Futsal Championship doubling as the ASEAN qualifiers, where they were drawn into two groups of five teams.
East Asia had five entrants, where they were all placed in one group.

The draw for the qualifiers was held on 2 September 2015 at the AFC House in Kuala Lumpur, Malaysia. Only the groups in West Asia were drawn, as no draw was necessary for Central Asia and East Asia, and the draw for the 2015 AFF Futsal Championship had already been held on 16 June 2015 in Singapore.

Apart from the four direct qualifiers, the remaining twelve slots in the final tournament were allocated as follows:
Each zone (except South Asia) was allocated a minimum of two slots.
Additional slots were allocated based on the technical standard team ranking from fourth to seventh placing in the 2014 AFC Futsal Championship, with West Asia (4th and 7th) and ASEAN (5th and 6th) each allocated two additional slots.

Notes
1 Later replaced by the next best team from the West Zone qualifiers due to FIFA's suspension of the Kuwait Football Association.
2 Non-FIFA member, ineligible for World Cup.

Format
In each group, teams played each other once at a centralised venue. The top two teams of each group (total 12 teams) qualified for the final tournament.

Tiebreakers
The teams were ranked according to points (3 points for a win, 1 point for a draw, 0 points for a loss). If tied on points, tiebreakers would be applied in the following order:
Greater number of points obtained in the group matches between the teams concerned;
Goal difference resulting from the group matches between the teams concerned;
Greater number of goals scored in the group matches between the teams concerned;
If, after applying criteria 1 to 3, teams still have an equal ranking, criteria 1 to 3 are reapplied exclusively to the matches between the teams in question to determine their final rankings. If this procedure does not lead to a decision, criteria 5 to 9 apply;
Goal difference in all the group matches;
Greater number of goals scored in all the group matches;
Penalty shoot-out if only two teams are involved and they are both on the field of play;
Fewer score calculated according to the number of yellow and red cards received in the group matches (1 point for a single yellow card, 3 points for a red card as a consequence of two yellow cards, 3 points for a direct red card, 4 points for a yellow card followed by a direct red card);
Drawing of lots.

Zones
The matches were played on the following dates:
West Zone: 1–3 October 2015
ASEAN Zone: 8–16 October 2015
Central Zone: 14–16 November 2015
East Zone: 14–19 November 2015

West Zone
For the draw, the teams were seeded according to their performance in the previous season in 2014.
Pot 1: Iraq, Lebanon
Pot 2: Qatar, Saudi Arabia
Pot 3: Bahrain, United Arab Emirates
Pot 4: Jordan
All matches were held in Malaysia.
Times listed were UTC+8.

Group A

Group B

ASEAN Zone

All matches were held in Thailand. The tournament was originally to be held in Indonesia before the suspension of its football association.
Times listed were UTC+7.

Group A

Group B

Semi-finals

Third place match

Final

Central Zone
All matches were held in Tajikistan.
Times listed were UTC+5.

East Zone
All matches were held in Mongolia.
Times listed were UTC+8.

Qualified teams
The following 16 teams qualified for the final tournament.

3 Bold indicates champion for that year. Italic indicates host for that year.

References

External links
, the-AFC.com

2016 AFC Futsal Championship
AFC Futsal Championship qualification
qualification
International futsal competitions hosted by Malaysia
International futsal competitions hosted by Thailand
Futsal in Tajikistan
Futsal in Mongolia